Thus have I heard is the common translation of the first line of the standard introduction (Pāli and ) of Buddhist discourses. This phrase serves to confirm that the discourse is coming from the Buddha himself, as a "seal of authenticity". Buddhist tradition maintains that the disciple Ānanda used the formula for the first time, as a form of personal testimony, but this is disputed by some scholars. It is also disputed how the phrase relates to the words that follow, and several theories have been developed with regard to how the text was originally intended to be read. The formula has also been used in later Mahāyāna and Vajrayāna discourses.

History and function 

According to Buddhist tradition—based on the commentary to the Dīgha Nikāya—the formula was first used by the disciple Ānanda during the First Buddhist Council held at Rājagṛha (present-day Rajgir). At this gathering, the Buddhist Canon was established, and Ānanda was given the role of rapporteur of the Buddha's teachings, being the personal attendant of the Buddha.

The formula is usually followed by the place where the discourse is given, as well as the names and numbers of those it is given to. In the Chinese exegetical  tradition, the formula is known as the generic preface, as opposed to the subsequent part that differs between discourses, introducing the specifics, known as the specific preface. In some Early Buddhist Texts, other similar constructions are used, such as 'This was said by the Blessed One' in the Itivuttaka.

Interpretation and translation 
The formula is glossed by the 5th-century Indian commentator Buddhaghosa as "received in the Buddha's presence". Indologist Jean Filliozat (190682) disagreed with the traditional explanation that Ānanda was the one who invented the formula, arguing that the formula is an odd way to describe a first-hand witness account, as it sounds as though what follows is hearsay. He argued instead that it was a later compiler who added it. However, comparing Buddhist with Jain texts, Sanskrit scholar John Brough (191784) concluded the formula indicates personal testimony as opposed to hearsay.

Indologist Jean Przyluski (18851944) argued that the formula originally may also have meant that the Buddhist discourses were presented as part of sacred revelation (śruti). This was  intended to prove that the Buddhist texts were on the same level with, or superior than, the Vedas in the Brahmanical tradition. Brough concurred with Przyluski that this may have played some role in the development of the phrase, but concluded that the motivation of declaring oneself a witness of the Buddha's teaching "could by itself quite adequately explain it". Brough relates a traditional account in which the Buddha's disciples weep when they hear Ānanda say the words Thus have I heard for the first time, "marvelling that they should hear again the very words of their dead master". Indologist  disagrees with Brough, however, citing two discourses from the Dīgha Nikāya and Majjhima Nikāya in which the formula refers to what "... was acquired through communication by others", as opposed to personal experience. Klaus also points at another expression which  that a discourse has been directly received from someone, that is samukkhā me taṃ ... samukkhā paṭiggahitaṃ, meaning 'I heard and learned this  own lips': an expression often used with regard to the Buddha. He proposes that the formula Thus have I heard does mark a discourse as the Buddha's word, but not because the discourse has been heard from the Buddha's own lips by the speaker. He does admit that the early Sanskrit texts contain a later interpretation of the formula, which does refer to personal experience.

Indologist Étienne Lamotte (190383) argued it was the Buddha who had the formula placed at the beginning of the Buddhist discourses, conveying this through Ānanda.

In addition, the formula may have been used by editors to standardize the discourses, as it is even used in discourses given by Ānanda himself.

Punctuation 
There has been considerable debate as to how the first sentences of the preface of Buddhist discourses should be translated, especially with regard to punctuation. There are three main opinions. The first possible and most common translation is Thus have I heard. At one time the Blessed One was at ... in ... Buddhist studies scholar Mark Allon has defended this translation based on metrical and rhyme patterns. The words of the Pāli formula indicate the oral tradition through which the discourses were passed down. As with many parts of the discourses, the preface consist of rhymes to help memorization of the text, such as repetition of initial consonant sounds (alliteration; evaṃ, ekaṃ) and final sounds (homoioteleuton; evaṃ, suttaṃ, ekaṃ and samayaṃ). These rhyme patterns show that the two phrases, the first phrase starting with 'thus' (evaṃ me suttaṃ) and the second phrase, ekaṃ samayaṃ (Pāli), 'at one time', were seen as two  separate units. On a similar note, the first phrase has a vedha type metrical pattern, which is repeated by the second phrase, ekaṃ samayaṃ, 'at one time'. Buddhist studies scholars Fernando Tola and Carmen Dragonetti have also argued for this translation with a three-word pre-amble (the three words being evaṃ me suttaṃ), on the grounds that it gives the best meaning to the context.

However, numerous scholars read the words 'at one time' as combined with the first phrase, making for a five-word preamble. In their opinion, the first lines should be translated to Thus have i heard at one time. The Blessed One was staying at ... in ... This translation is often attributed to Brough, but was first proposed by Orientalist Alexander von Staël-Holstein (18771937). Von Staël-Holstein preferred this translation, basing himself on Indian commentaries, and Brough based himself on Tibetan translations, common usage in Avadānas and Early Buddhist Texts, as well as Pāli and Sanskrit commentators. Indologist Oskar von Hinüber rejects Von Staël-Holstein's and Brough's interpretation, however. He argues that although in Sanskrit it may be possible to connect the two phrases in one sentence, in Pāli this is highly unusual. Von Hinüber further states that in the early Pāli texts, as well as the Pāli commentaries, separating the two phrases is actually quite common. Konrad Klaus agrees with von Hinüber's arguments. Buddhist studies scholar Brian Galloway further states that many Tibetan and Indian commentators such as Vimalamitra (8th century) did not support a five-word but rather a three-word pre-amble, reading at one time with the text following it. Religious Studies scholar Mark Tatz disagrees with Galloway's interpretation, however, providing several reasons. In response, Galloway rejects most of Tatz' arguments.

A third group of scholars believe that the details of the place should also be mentioned within the same sentence, with no punctuation: Thus have I heard at the one time when the Blessed one was staying at ... in ... This type of translation, called the "double-jointed construction", has been proposed by Religious Studies scholar Paul Harrison and Buddhologist . Harrison bases himself on Tibetan translations and discussion in Sanskrit commentaries.

Usage in Buddhist history 

Prior to the 5th century, Chinese translations of Buddhist texts would often translate the standard formula as Heard like this, leaving out the I for stylistic reasons. During the 5th century, translator Kumārajīva (344413 CE) started rendering the formula as Rushi wowen, which became the standard Chinese translation, despite its unnatural construction. 

Mahāyāna and Vajrayāna traditions considered many later discourses the Buddha's word, and also included the formula at the beginning of those. Indeed, the 5th-century Chinese commentary Dazhidulun recommends editors to do so.  Often, Mahāyāna commentaries state that the formula can not only refer to Ānanda, but also to certain bodhisattvas, such as Mañjuśrī. Modern scholarship has drawn into question the historical value of most of these introductions of Mahāyāna discourses, though some scholars do not exclude the possibility that some of the content of the discourses themselves goes back to the Buddha.

Notes

Citations

References

External links 
 Thus have I heard, overview of the punctuation debate as of 1994, by translator Maurice Walshe, archived from the original on 10 February 2006

Buddhist literature
Oral tradition
Buddhist practices